Abbey is a surname. Notable people with the surname include:
 Bert Abbey (1869–1962), American baseball player
Bruce Abbey (born 1951), Canadian ice hockey player
 Charles Abbey (1913–1982), Australian politician
Charlie Abbey (1866–1926), American baseball player
 David Abbey (born 1941), English cricketer
 Edward Abbey (1927–1989), American author
 Edwin Austin Abbey (1852–1911), artist and illustrator
 George Abbey (born 1932), American National Aeronautics and Space Administration (NASA) official
 George Abbey (born 1978), Nigerian footballer
Grace Abbey (born 1999), English footballer
 Graham Abbey (born 1971), Canadian actor
 Helen Abbey (1915–2001), American statistician
 Henry Abbey (1842–1911), American poet
 Henry Eugene Abbey (1846–1896), theatre manager and producer
Jeffrey Abbey (born 1998), American racing driver
 Joe Abbey (1925–2014), American football player
 John Abbey (1785–1859), English organ builder
 John Roland Abbey (1894–1969), English book collector
 Leon Abbey (1900–1975), American jazz violinist and bandleader
 Lynn Abbey (born 1948), American author
 Nathan Abbey (born 1978), English footballer
Nelson Abbey (born 2003), English footballer
 Rita Deanin Abbey (1930–2021), American artist
 Robert Mensah Abbey, Ghanaian politician
 Ross Abbey (born 1953), Australian rules football player
 Zema Abbey (born 1977), English footballer

References 

English-language surnames